The Namibia women's cricket team toured the Netherlands and Germany in June and July 2022 to play a five-match bilateral Women's Twenty20 International (WT20I) series against the Netherlands and a three-match WT20I series against Germany. The first three matches in the Netherlands were originally scheduled to be played at Sportpark Harga in Schiedam, and the last two games of the series were scheduled to be played at Sportpark Westvliet in Voorburg. All three matches of the Germany series were played at the Bayer Uerdingen Cricket Ground, in Krefeld. The Netherlands won their series against Namibia 3–2, after several closely contested matches.

Squads

Netherlands v Namibia WT20I series

After the first scheduled match of the series  in Schiedam was abandoned due to a wet outfield, Namibia won a low-scoring opening contest with one ball remaining in their innings. However, later the same day, Netherlands won the next game by 70 runs after captain Heather Siegers was dropped five times in her innings of 41 and the Namibians were then bowled out for only 29 runs. the series moved on to Voorburg, where the sides again traded wins with Namibia again chased down their target in the final over, before hosts completed a 5-run victory in a rain-affected match later in the afternoon. The series decider was another close encounter, with the visitors looking set complete another tense run-chase, but a wicket maiden by Frederique Overdijk in the final over sealed a 2-run success and a 3–2 series win for the Netherlands.

1st WT20I

2nd WT20I

3rd WT20I

4th WT20I

5th WT20I

6th WT20I

Germany v Namibia WT20I series

1st WT20I

2nd WT20I

3rd WT20I

Notes

References

External links
 Series home at ESPNcricinfo (Netherlands v Namibia)
 Series home at ESPNcricinfo (Germany v Namibia)

Associate international cricket competitions in 2022